Mustafa Pasha Kara Mehmed-zade ( 1740–1755) was the Ottoman vali (governor) of Üsküb (Skopje), beginning in July 1755. He was a vizier (provincial governor) and a former kapudan (navy admiral).

Career

Sanjak of Smederevo
From July to November 1740 he served as the muhafiz ("guardian") of Belgrade (Sanjak of Smederevo), succeeding Ali Pasha Abdi-zade who was the first muhafiz after the Austrian-Ottoman peace (1739–40).

Sanjak of Üsküp
He was the vali (governor) of Üsküp (Skopje), beginning in July 1755.

Annotations
Name:

References

Governors of the Ottoman Empire
18th-century people from the Ottoman Empire
Ottoman period in the history of North Macedonia